Close to You is the second studio album by American duo Carpenters, released on August 19, 1970. In 2003, the album was ranked number 175 on Rolling Stones list of the 500 greatest albums of all time, maintaining the rating in a 2012 revised list. The album contains the hit singles "(They Long to Be) Close to You" and "We've Only Just Begun". The former was the song which earned the Carpenters an international reputation. The album topped the Canadian Albums Chart and peaked at number 2 on the US Billboard albums chart. It was also successful in the United Kingdom, entering the top 50 of the official chart for 76 weeks during the first half of the 1970s.

The album and its singles earned Carpenters eight Grammy Award nominations including Album of the Year, Song of the Year, Record of the Year. It won the Best New Artist and Best Contemporary Vocal Performance by a Duo, Group or Chorus for the album.

Background and song information
Drummer Hal Blaine reported that the Carpenters' parents were in the recording studio for the Close to You album and "You could tell right away they ruled the roost." According to Blaine, Karen's mother dictated her singing style and expressed disapproval that she did not perform as a drummer on all the songs. Blaine countered that though Karen was a capable drummer, she was accustomed to playing loudly for live performances and thus was not familiar with the different requirements of recording in a professional studio; however, she had been informed beforehand of Blaine's involvement and indicated her approval.

"(They Long to Be) Close to You" was the first Burt Bacharach/Hal David composition the Carpenters covered. The song was recorded time and time again during the sixties, but didn't do well at all until the Carpenters version. It became Richard and Karen Carpenter's first RIAA-certified Gold single, as well as their first Billboard Hot 100 single that reached the Top 10. It stayed at number 1 for 4 weeks, and became the Carpenters' iconic song. Richard devoted the song to Karen.

"We've Only Just Begun" started out as a commercial for Crocker Citizen's Bank in 1970, composed by Paul Williams and Roger Nichols. The commercial showed a couple getting married and starting their life together. In August 1970, it became the Carpenters' second RIAA-certified Gold single.

Originally written by Ralph Carmichael for the early contemporary Christian musical Tell It Like It Is, "Love Is Surrender" was a song Richard and Karen heard during their teen years.

"Maybe It's You" is a song written by Richard Carpenter and John Bettis for their previous band, Spectrum. The oboe solo was played by Doug Strawn.

"Reason to Believe" is a song composed by Tim Hardin in the 1960s. Rod Stewart made a hit with it in 1971. Karen claimed in a live concert that the reason why they love the song is because it was one of the first songs they performed together as a group.

"Help!" is a song written by John Lennon and Paul McCartney in early 1965. The Carpenters produced four Beatles covers ("Ticket to Ride", "Help!", "Can't Buy Me Love" from Your Navy Presents, and "Nowhere Man").

"Baby It's You" is a song composed by Burt Bacharach, Barney Williams, and Mack David. It was sung by Richard and Karen in 1970, and performed on their TV show, Make Your Own Kind of Music.

"I'll Never Fall in Love Again" is the third consecutive Burt Bacharach composition on the album. It was included on their medley the following year, on the album Carpenters. According to Tom Riddle of Your Navy Presents, there was a 29-part vocal harmony on the song. Originally part of the score for Bacharach and David's 1968 musical Promises, Promises, the song had provided a top-ten hit for Dionne Warwick in January 1970.

Originally performed by Karen and Richard in the California State University, Long Beach choir in 1969, "Crescent Noon" is a song composed by Richard Carpenter and John Bettis.

"Mr. Guder" was dedicated to Richard Carpenter and John Bettis's boss at Disneyland, Vic Guder, who fired them. They had been hired to play old-time music on piano and banjo at the park's "Coke Corner" on Main Street, U.S.A., but they persisted in playing contemporary tunes that the patrons requested.

Critical reception

Close to You was nominated for Record of the Year and Album of the Year at the 13th annual Grammy awards (1970). "Close To You" won the Carpenters a Grammy for Best New Artist and another Grammy for Best Contemporary Vocal Performance By A Duo, Group or Chorus the same year.

AllMusic's retrospective review deemed Close to You "a surprisingly strong album", particularly praising Richard Carpenter's original compositions "Maybe it's You", "Crescent Noon", and "Mr. Guder", describing them as superlative displays of both Karen Carpenter's vocal work and Richard's arranging talents. They also derided contemporary criticism against the album, insinuating that the negative reaction stemmed from Close to You being a successful pop record at a time of great political turmoil.

Track listing
All lead vocals by Karen Carpenter except where noted.

Personnel

Musicians
Karen Carpenter – vocals, drums
Hal Blaine – drums
Richard Carpenter – vocals, keyboards, arrangements and orchestration
Joe Osborn – bass
Danny Woodhams – bass
Jim Horn – woodwinds
Bob Messenger – woodwinds
Doug Strawn – woodwinds

Technical
Jack Daugherty – producer
Ray Gerhardt – engineer
Dick Bogert – engineer
Tom Wilkes – art direction
Kessel/Brehm Photography – photography
Bernie Grundman, Richard Carpenter – remastering at Bernie Grundman Mastering

Charts

Weekly charts

Year-end charts

Certifications

References

1970 albums
The Carpenters albums
Albums produced by Jack Daugherty (musician)
A&M Records albums
Albums recorded at A&M Studios